This is a list of Gentoo Linux derivatives.

Calculate Linux

ChromiumOS and ChromeOS

Container Linux (formerly CoreOS)

FireballISO 

FireballISO (or "Fireball") is a VMware virtual appliance that builds a security-hardened Live CD containing a stripped-down custom version of Gentoo Linux. The original intent of the project is focused on providing firewall and networking services to a network, but the appliance can be customized in almost limitless ways to build bootable ISOs that can do many different things. When burned to a CD-ROM, it will allow a perhaps otherwise unused, old computer to boot it and act as a network security device. It may also be used in a virtual environment as a secure cloud appliance. Notable features in the generated ISO include:

 (Version 1.4) Encryption is now truly optional (there were issues with how 1.3 handled unencrypted builds). Many updates to Gentoo Hardened files, including compiler-provided increased stack protection. Extensive cleanups to build script; now supports "test" build which can be customized to make a different ISO than the "deployment" build, suitable for testing or other purposes. Many features removed (tunnels, DSL support, etc.) to make appliance more generic.
 (Version 1.3) Except for the files required early in the boot process (such as the kernel and initramfs), the contents can now be optionally encrypted, which makes it much more difficult and time-consuming for someone that may steal the ISO to access the contents. Default encryption is 256-bit AES. See the documentation for issues related to encryption.
 (Version 1.2) All programs updated and recompiled with Hardened Gentoo kernel and compiler toolchain, resulting in increased protection from several kinds of overflows and other security vulnerabilities.
 IPv4 and IPv6 support
 iptables and ip6tables firewalls
 SSH server for full command-line access
 DNS cache and DHCP server
 tcpdump & other networking utilities
 Perl and Python scripting languages
 NTP client
 Extremely customizable, just like a regular Gentoo Linux system
 Unnecessary programs removed from generated ISO; can be customized for even smaller size
 Low hardware requirements for ISO: Pentium computer with a CD-ROM drive capable of booting, and two network interface cards, or equivalent virtual environment. No hard disk, monitor, or keyboard is needed for the unencrypted configuration (though a monitor and keyboard might be useful for troubleshooting configurations as needed). A keyboard and monitor are required at start-up if encryption is used.

The virtual appliance can be updated just like a normal Gentoo system, allowing new Live CD images to be generated with the latest security fixes, bug corrections, additional features, and updated configurations. The Live CD should be re-generated as often as important changes are released by the authors of the various software packages it contains.

Release history
 Fireball Release 1 - March 3, 2009
 Fireball Release 1.1 - June 22, 2009
 Fireball Release 1.2 - December 30, 2010
 Fireball Release 1.3 - January 13, 2012
 Fireball Release 1.4 - March 6, 2015
 Fireball Release 1.5 - June 9, 2017

Funtoo 

Funtoo Linux( ) is a Linux distribution based on Gentoo Linux, created by Daniel Robbins (the founder and former project leader of Gentoo Linux) in 2008. It's developed by a core team of developers, and built around a basic vision of improving the core technologies previously used by Gentoo Linux.

History 
In early 2008, Robbins proposed to resolve the Gentoo Foundation problems. But he had left the project in 2004, and his offer was refused. The Funtoo project was born as an initiative to implement his vision, with aims to share innovations.

Features
Funtoo is a source based Linux distribution.

Core technologies
Funtoo features in addition to native UTF-8 by default include:

Kits 
In July 2017 Funtoo switched from plain portage approach to splitting the portage tree into kits. This should tie software updates together and help with the dependency problems of a rolling release distribution. Kits also are gaining maturity status as they are tested and as patches are applied.

Git
Funtoo uses Git to store the Portage tree. The tree is split into kits now with meta-repo being the repo holding all the kits as submodules.

Metro
Metro is an automatable software package for building stages used in installing Funtoo.

boot-update
boot-update provides a unified mechanism for configuring the GNU GRUB2 and GRUB Legacy boot loader versions.

Core networking
Funtoo has its own core networking solution to allow users to simplify the creation of complex network interfaces based on pre-created profiles.

Kernel
Since May 2015 Funtoo offers a pre-build generic kernel with stage.  Although Funtoo is a source-based distribution, it should be possible to use a prebuilt Linux kernel. Funtoo no longer encourages the use of the Sabayon kernel; however, with many improvements to Funtoo's design and init process, one should be able to load a binary kernel plus initrd from a preferred distribution hosting a precompiled/preconfigured kernel. Ubuntu's kernel linux-3.2.0-17-generic has been tested and is known to work. This can benefit those who like to avoid building custom kernels. Using a generic kernel from another distribution should be straightforward if using boot-update .

Other differences 
There are multitude of users blog posts or discussions about difference between Gentoo and Funtoo. 
The most marked difference between the two would be no systemd support in Funtoo, but still delivering for example a working Gnome desktop without the systemd need.

Incognito

Nova

Pentoo

Sabayon Linux

Redcore Linux

Tin Hat Linux 

Tin Hat is a security-focused Linux distribution derived from Hardened Gentoo Linux. It aims to provide a very secure, stable, and fast desktop environment that lives purely in RAM. Tin Hat boots from CD, or optionally from USB flash drive, but it does not mount any file system directly from the boot device. Instead, Tin Hat employs a large SquashFS image from the boot device which expands into tmpfs upon booting. This makes for long boot times, but fast speeds during use.

Design goal 
The central design consideration in Tin Hat is to construct an operating system that can hide data from an attacker even if he has physical access to the computer. Physical access to a computer with unencrypted filesystems does not secure the data and an attacker could easily retrieve the data. Encrypting the filesystem provides protection from such an attack, but many implementations of encryption do not hide the fact that data is encrypted on the filesystem. For example, the LUKS encryption system includes metadata which detail the block cipher and block cipher mode used in encryption. This information does not help the attacker decrypt the filesystem, but it does reveal that it contains encrypted data and not random data. However, Tin Hat stores its filesystem in the RAM, leaving no data in the computer's hard drive. If the user stores any data via a more permanent means than RAM, the encrypted data is indiscernible from random data.

Tin Hat's preferred method of encryption is via loop-aes v3.

Beyond these considerations, Tin Hat has to also protect against more common exploits based on networking or security holes in software. The hardening model chosen is PaX/Grsecurity which is already provided by the Hardened Gentoo project. Hardening of the kernel and the toolchain make most code born exploits less likely. A non-modular compiled kernel further frustrates the insertion of malicious kernel modules.

Ututo

Hroontoo 
Hroontoo is a Gentoo based homemade (LiveCd) console distro for linux administrators.
It was created in 2010.

VidaLinux 

VidaLinux (VLOS) was an operating system based on Gentoo Linux. A GNOME-based OS, VidaLinux installs with the Red Hat Anaconda installer. VidaLinux tries to provide most appropriate tools and support for home and office use, such as PPC support and RealPlayer.

History
As of December 3, 2009, VLOS has been rebuilt with Daniel Robbins' fork of Gentoo Linux called Funtoo.

Versions
Vidalinux comes in two different flavors; one can be downloaded, while the other must be purchased. While the downloaded version technically has all the same software packages as the purchased version, the difference is that the purchased version (which can be bought for 25 USD) contains many binaries of often used programs, while the downloaded version forces the user to download ebuilds of these packages and build the binaries themselves, which requires more time.

Version History

 1.0 October 4, 2004
 1.1 December 20, 2004
 1.2 August 1, 2005
 1.2.1 January 18, 2006
 1.2.1-r2 January 30, 2006
 1.3 18 October 2006

References

External links
 
 
 List of distributions based on Gentoo on the Gentoo wiki.

Gentoo Linux